

This is a list of the National Register of Historic Places listings in Manatee County, Florida.

This is intended to be a complete list of the properties and districts on the National Register of Historic Places in Manatee County, Florida, United States. The locations of National Register properties and districts for which the latitude and longitude coordinates are included below, may be seen in a map.

There are 33 properties and districts listed on the National Register in the county.

Current listings

KEY

|}

See also
 List of National Historic Landmarks in Florida
 National Register of Historic Places listings in Florida

References

External links

 Florida's History Through Its Places: Manatee County

 
Manatee County